In geometry, a Petrie polygon for a regular polytope of  dimensions is a skew polygon in which every  consecutive sides (but no ) belongs to one of the facets.  The Petrie polygon of a regular polygon is the regular polygon itself; that of a regular polyhedron is a skew polygon such that every two consecutive sides (but no three) belongs to one of the faces. Petrie polygons are named for mathematician John Flinders Petrie.

For every regular polytope there exists an orthogonal projection onto a plane such that one Petrie polygon becomes a regular polygon with the remainder of the projection interior to it. The plane in question is the Coxeter plane of the symmetry group of the polygon, and the number of sides, is the Coxeter number of the Coxeter group. These polygons and projected graphs are useful in visualizing symmetric structure of the higher-dimensional regular polytopes.

Petrie polygons can be defined more generally for any embedded graph. They form the faces of another embedding of the same graph, usually on a different surface, called the Petrie dual.

History 
John Flinders Petrie (1907–1972) was the son of Egyptologists Hilda and Flinders Petrie. He was born in 1907 and as a schoolboy showed remarkable promise of mathematical ability. In periods of intense concentration he could answer questions about complicated four-dimensional objects by visualizing them.

He first noted the importance of the regular skew polygons which appear on the surface of regular polyhedra and higher polytopes.  Coxeter explained in 1937 how he and Petrie began to expand the classical subject of regular polyhedra:
One day in 1926, J. F. Petrie told me with much excitement that he had discovered two new regular polyhedral; infinite but free of false vertices. When my incredulity had begun to subside, he described them to me: one consisting of squares, six at each vertex, and one consisting of hexagons, four at each vertex.
In 1938 Petrie collaborated with Coxeter, Patrick du Val, and H.T. Flather to produce The Fifty-Nine Icosahedra for publication.
Realizing the geometric facility of the skew polygons used by Petrie, Coxeter named them after his friend when he wrote Regular Polytopes.

The idea of Petrie polygons was later extended to semiregular polytopes.

The Petrie polygons of the regular polyhedra 

The regular duals, {p,q} and {q,p}, are contained within the same projected Petrie polygon.
In the images of dual compounds on the right it can be seen that their Petrie polygons have rectangular intersections in the points where the edges touch the common midsphere.

The Petrie polygons of the Kepler–Poinsot polyhedra are hexagons {6} and decagrams {10/3}.

Infinite regular skew polygons (apeirogon) can also be defined as being the Petrie polygons of the regular tilings, having angles of 90, 120, and 60 degrees of their square, hexagon and triangular faces respectively.

Infinite regular skew polygons also exist as Petrie polygons of the regular hyperbolic tilings, like the order-7 triangular tiling, {3,7}:

The Petrie polygon of regular polychora (4-polytopes) 

The Petrie polygon for the regular polychora {p, q ,r} can also be determined, such that every three consecutive sides (but no four) belong to one of the polychoron's cells.

The Petrie polygon projections of regular and uniform polytopes 

The Petrie polygon projections are useful for the visualization of polytopes of dimension four and higher.

Hypercubes

A hypercube of dimension n has a Petrie polygon of size 2n, which is also the number of its facets.
So each of the (n − 1)-cubes forming its surface has n − 1 sides of the Petrie polygon among its edges.

Irreducible polytope families

This table represents Petrie polygon projections of 3 regular families (simplex, hypercube, orthoplex), and the exceptional Lie group En which generate semiregular and uniform polytopes for dimensions 4 to 8.

Notes

References 
 Coxeter, H. S. M. (1947, 63, 73) Regular Polytopes, 3rd ed. New York: Dover, 1973. (sec 2.6 Petrie Polygons pp. 24–25, and Chapter 12, pp. 213–235, The generalized Petrie polygon )
 Coxeter, H.S.M. (1974) Regular complex polytopes. Section 4.3 Flags and Orthoschemes, Section 11.3 Petrie polygons
 Ball, W. W. R. and H. S. M. Coxeter (1987) Mathematical Recreations and Essays, 13th ed. New York: Dover. (p. 135)
 Coxeter, H. S. M. (1999) The Beauty of Geometry: Twelve Essays, Dover Publications 
 Peter McMullen, Egon Schulte (2002) Abstract Regular Polytopes, Cambridge University Press. 
 Steinberg, Robert,ON THE NUMBER OF SIDES OF A PETRIE POLYGON, 2018

See also

External links

 
 
 
 
 
 
 

Polytopes